Lamar Consolidated Independent School District, also Lamar Consolidated ISD, Lamar CISD or LCISD, is a public school district in the U.S. state of Texas within the Houston–Sugar Land–Metropolitan Area.

Lamar CISD includes almost 43 percent of  Fort Bend County, covering the cities of Richmond, Rosenberg, Kendleton, Simonton, Thompsons, Weston Lakes, a very small portion of Sugar Land, most of Fulshear, most of the village of Pleak, the census-designated place of Cumings, a portion of the Pecan Grove CDP, the community of Lakemont, the unincorporated areas of Booth, Crabb, Foster, and Powell Point, and most of the unincorporated rural areas (including areas in Sugar Land's extraterritorial jurisdiction (ETJ) in central Fort Bend County.

Lamar CISD enrolls over 27,000 students and is the fastest-growing district in Fort Bend County. In 2013 it received the highest possible academic rating (Met Standard) from the Texas Education Agency.

Dr. Roosevelt Nivens began his tenure as superintendent on June 1, 2021.

The 6th Junior and High School opened in the fall of 2021 with the completion of Dr.Thomas E Randle High School and Harry Wright Junior High School.

The school board approved names for 6 new campuses on April 19 , 2022, which included. 3 New Elementary Schools, 1 New Middle School, 1 New Junior High School, 1 New High School.

History
In 1947 LCISD was first defined in the Fort Bend County public records. It was a consolidation of Richmond ISD, Rosenberg ISD and Beasley ISD along with a number of rural "Common School Districts". The names of the Common School Districts were: Rice Farm, Thompsons, Booth, Simonton, Fulshear, Foster, Brandt, George, Cottonwood & Pleak.
Beginning in 1985 LCISD had served middle and high school students from the Kendleton Independent School District (KISD)'s boundaries. KISD and its one school, Powell Point Elementary, were merged into Lamar CISD on July 1, 2010. KISD ceased operations on that date and LCISD began serving elementary students from the former KISD. Kendleton ISD was originally one Common School District, also called Kendleton. In 2009, Lamar CISD was named an H.E.B. Excellence in Education School District.

Dr. Thomas Randle served as the district superintendent from 2001 until his retirement in 2021. During his tenure, LCISD grew from approximately 16,000 students to 34,000 students.

List of schools

Secondary schools

High schools (9-12)
 Lamar Consolidated High School (Rosenberg) (1949)
 B. F. Terry High School (Rosenberg) (1980)
 Foster High School (unincorporated area, Richmond postal address) (2001)
 George Ranch High School (unincorporated area, Richmond postal address) (2010)
 Fulshear High School (Fulshear) (2016)
 Randle High School (unincorporated area, Richmond postal address) (2021)

Junior high schools (6-8)
 George Junior High School (Rosenberg)
 Mirabeau Lamar Junior High School (Rosenberg)
 Andrew Briscoe Junior High School (Unincorporated area, Richmond address)
 Antoinette Davis Reading Junior High School (Unincorporated area, Richmond address)
 Dean Leaman Junior High School (Fulshear)
 Harry Wright Junior High School (Unincorporated area, Richmond address)

Primary schools

Middle schools
(5 only)
 Jane Johnson Wessendorff Middle School (Rosenberg)
 Jose Antonio Navarro Middle School (Rosenberg)
 Henry Wertheimer Middle School (Unincorporated area)
 Mary "Polly" Moore Jones Ryon Middle School (Unincorporated area)
 James Roberts Middle School (Fulshear)

Elementary schools
 Judge James C. Adolphus Elementary (Unincorporated area)
 John M. Arredondo Elementary (Unincorporated area)
 Stephen F. Austin Elementary School (Unincorporated area, Pecan Grove)
2006 National Blue Ribbon School
 Cecil A. Beasley Elementary School (Beasley)
 Carl Briscoe Bentley Elementary School (Fulshear)
 James Bowie Elementary School (Rosenberg)
 Bess Campbell Elementary School (Sugar Land, Greatwood)
 Susanna Dickinson Elementary School (Sugar Land, Greatwood)
 Samuel Miles Frost Elementary School (Unincorporated area, Pecan Grove)
 Joe A. Hubenak Elementary (Unincorporated area)
 Hubenak opened in 2009 and has a capacity of 740. The cost was $19.8 million. By 2015 Hubenak had more than 1,200 students, prompting the district to open another elementary school.
 John Huggins Elementary School (Fulshear)
 Irma Dru Hutchison Elementary School (Richmond)
 A.W. Jackson Elementary School (Rosenberg)
2018 National Blue Ribbon School
 Jane Long Elementary School (Richmond)
 Hillman F. McNeill Elementary School (Richmond)
 Meyer Elementary School (Rosenberg)
 T.L. Pink Elementary School (Richmond)
 Taylor Ray Elementary School (Rosenberg)
 Deaf Smith Elementary School (Richmond)
 Cora Thomas Elementary (Unincorporated area)
 Thomas opened in 2009 and has a capacity of 740. The cost was $18.4 million. Students previously going to Meyer and Williams elementaries were moved to Thomas.
 William B. Travis Elementary School (Rosenberg)
 Manford Williams Elementary School (Richmond)
 William Velasquez Elementary School (Unincorporated area)
2012 National Blue Ribbon School

Early Childhood
 Juan Seguin Early Childhood Center (Richmond)

References

External links

 Lamar Consolidated Independent School District

 
School districts in Fort Bend County, Texas
Rosenberg, Texas
Sugar Land, Texas
1947 establishments in Texas
School districts established in 1947